Kaiser Wilhelm is a common reference to two German emperors:
 Wilhelm I, German Emperor (1797–1888)
 Wilhelm II, German Emperor (1859–1941)

Kaiser Wilhelm may also refer to:
 Kaiser Wilhelm (baseball) (1874–1936), early 20th century baseball pitcher
 Kaiser Wilhelm Society, a German entity
 Kaiser Wilhelm Memorial Church, a memorial church for Wilhelm I
 Kaiser-Wilhelm-Brücke, a bridge in Wilhelmshaven
 Kaiser-Wilhelmsland, a part of New Guinea